Irène Pittelioen (13 May 1927 – 21 August 2011) was a French gymnast. She competed at the 1948 Summer Olympics and the 1952 Summer Olympics.

References

1927 births
2011 deaths
French female artistic gymnasts
Olympic gymnasts of France
Gymnasts at the 1948 Summer Olympics
Gymnasts at the 1952 Summer Olympics
Sportspeople from Lille
20th-century French women